Visdals kvintett was a Norwegian folk group that existed between 1987 and 1999, and came from Vågå, Lom og Sør-Fron. The group name is the leader of the orchestra's last name.

The quintet got started as a continuation of "Ola Sandums kvintett/kvartett" (1978–1987), when Ola Sandum was replaced by Jan Visdal.

Crew

Visdals kvintett 
 (1987–1999) Jan Visdal - accordion
 (1987–1999) Svein Stensrud - accordion
 (1987–1999) Leif Inge Schjølberg - violin
 (1987–1999) Odd Ymbjørgøyen - guitar
 (1994–1999) Ola B. Visdal - contrabass
 (1989–1994) Ole Foss - contrabass
 (1987–1989) Reidar Ymbjørgøyen - bass guitar

Ola Sandums kvintett/kvartett 
 Ola Sandum - accordion
 Svein Stensrud - accordion
 Leif Inge Schjølberg - violin
 Ivar Schjølberg - violin
 Arne Skogum - violin
 Odd Ymbjørgøyen - guitar
 Birger Holen - guitar
 Reidar Ymbjørgøyen - bass guitar

Discography 
 Fante Nils (1989)
 Slåttdonan (1996)
 Ved Gjende (1997)

Achievements 
 1990 Gold at "Landsfestivalen i Gamaldansmusikk", Oppdal
 1990 Silver in 'Kappspel', NRK's competition in gammaldans, Fagernes
 1991 Bronze at "Landsfestivalen i Gamaldansmusikk", Vågå
 1993 Bronze in 'Kappspel', NRK's competition in gammaldans, Nord-Sel
 1994 Gold at "Landsfestivalen i Gamaldansmusikk", Røros
 1995 Silver at "Landsfestivalen i Gamaldansmusikk", Vinstra
 1997 Gold at "Landsfestivalen i Gamaldansmusikk", Otta

Norwegian musical groups